The Halifax Regional Municipality (HRM) in the Canadian province of Nova Scotia is composed of more than 200 communities and neighbourhoods. As of the 2021 Census, the municipality has a landmass of 547,557 hectares (5,475.57 km2) and is home to 439,819 people.

The urban area (population centre) of the municipality consists of Bedford, Dartmouth, Halifax, and their respective environs. Halifax's urban area is the most built-up area of the municipality, and is the largest urban area in Atlantic Canada. The landmass of the urban area is about 23,829 hectares (238.29 km2), and is home to 348,634 people as of the 2021 Census.

Urban communities

Halifax area
 Armdale
 Beechville
 Beechwood Park
 Boulderwood
 Clayton Park
 Cowie Hill 
 Downtown Halifax
 Fairmount
 Fairview
 The Hydrostone
 Jollimore
 Lakeside
 Melville Cove
 North End, Halifax
 Quinpool district
 Richmond
 Rockingham
 South End, Halifax
 Spring Garden
 Spryfield
 Timberlea
 West End, Halifax

Dartmouth area
 Albro Lake
 Brightwood
 Burnside
 Cole Harbour
 Crichton Park
 Crystal Heights
 Downtown Dartmouth
 Eastern Passage
 Highfield Park
 Imperoyal
 Manor Park
 Nantucket
 Portland Estates
 Portland Hills
 Portobello
 Port Wallace
 Shannon Park
 Shearwater
 Tuft's Cove
 Wallace Heights
 Waverley
 Westphal
 Woodlawn
 Woodside

Bedford area
 Bedford
 Beaver Bank
 Birch Cove 
 Fall River
 Glen Moir
 Hammonds Plains
 Lakeview
 Lower Sackville
 Middle Sackville
 Princes Lodge
 Upper Sackville
 Wellington
 Windsor Junction

Rural communities
Communities in bold are major communities.

Antrim
Bald Rock
Bear Cove
Barkhouse Settlement
Bayside
Beaver Dam
Beaver Harbour
Beaver Island
Beech Hill
Big Lake
Black Point
Blind Bay
Boutliers Point
Brookside
Brookville
Caribou Mines
Carroll's Corner
Centre Musquodoboit
Chaplin
Chaswood
Clam Harbour
Clam Bay
College Lake
Conrod Settlement
Crooks Brook
Cow Bay
Dean
Debaies Cove
Devon
Devils Island
Duncan's Cove
Dutch Settlement
East Chezzetcook
East Dover
East Jeddore,
East Pennant
East Preston
East Lawrencetown
East Loon Lake Village
East Petpeswick
East Quoddy
East Ship Harbour
Ecum Secum
Ecum Secum West
Elderbank
Elmsdale
Elmsvale
Enfield
Falkland
French Village
Ferguson's Cove
Fletchers Lake
Gaetz Brook
Glen Haven
Glen Margaret
Glenmore
Goffs
Greenwood
Governor Lake
Goodwood
Grand Desert
Grand Lake
Halibut Bay

Harrietsfield
Hackett's Cove
Hatchet Lake
Head of Chezzetcook
Head of Jeddore
Head of St. Margarets Bay
Herring Cove
Hubbards
Higginsville
Hubley
Indian Harbour
Ingramport
Jacket Lake
Jeddore Oyster Pond
Ketch Harbour
Kinsac
Lake Charlotte
Lake Echo
Lake Egmont
Lake Major
Lawrencetown
Lewis Lake
Lindsey Lake
Little Harbour
Liscomb Sanctuary
Lochaber Mines
Long Lake
Loon Lake
Lower East Chezzetcook 
Lower Lawrencetown
Lower Prospect
Lower Ship Harbour
Lower Three Fathom Harbour
Lucasville
McGraths Cove
McNabs Island
Marinette
Malay Falls
Meaghers Grant
Middle Musquodoboit
Middle Porters Lake
Mill Lake
Mineville
Mitchell Bay
Montague Gold Mines
Moosehead
Moose River Gold Mines
Moser River
Murphy Cove
Murchyville
Mushaboom
Musquodoboit Harbour
Myers Point
Newcomb Corner
Necum Teuch
North Beaver Bank
North Preston
Oakfield
Oldham
Ostrea Lake
Otter Lake
Owls Head
Oyster Pond
Pace Settlement
Peggys Cove

Peggys Cove Preservation Area
Pleasant Harbour
Pleasant Valley
Pennant Point
Pleasant Point
Portuguese Cove
Porters Lake
Popes Harbour
Port Dufferin
Prospect
Prospect Bay
Purcell's Cove
Queensland
River Lake
Sable Island
St.Margarets Bay
Sambro
Sambro Creek
Sambro Head
Salmon River Bridge
Sambro Head
Sandy Cove
Seabright
Seaforth
Shad Bay
Sheet Harbour
Sheet Harbour Passage
Ship Harbour
Simms Settlement
Smiths Settlement
Sober Island
South Section
Spry Bay
Spry Harbour
Stillwater Lake
Tangier
Tantallon
Taylors Head
Ten Mile Lake
Terence Bay
Three Fathom Harbour
Third Lake
Trafalgar
Upper Hammonds Plains
Upper Lakeville
Upper Musquodoboit
Upper Tantallon
Upper Lawrencetown
Watt Section
Williamswood
West Chezzetcook
West Dover
West Jeddore
West Lawrencetown
West Pennant
West Petpeswick
West Porters Lake
West Quoddy
Whites Lake
Wyses Corner
Yankeetown

References

External links
Halifax Regional Municipality Civic Addressing Website
Verified Community Boundaries
Explore HRM